Patrick Janik (born 26 March 1976) is a German independent politician. He has been mayor of the city of Starnberg since May 2020 after winning an absolute majority of 51.7% in the first ballot of the 2020 local Bavarian election, beating predecessor Eva John along with other candidates.

Biography
Janik completed his law degree at the Ludwig Maximilian University of Munich.

References

1976 births
Living people
Mayors of places in Bavaria
Ludwig Maximilian University of Munich alumni
People from Starnberg